Stephanie Mills is the tenth studio album by the American R&B singer Stephanie Mills, released in 1985 on MCA Records. Following her last release I've Got the Cure on Casablanca Records, Mills self-titled new album was the first release upon signing a new recording contract with MCA Records.

The album features R&B hits "Rising Desire", "Stand Back" and "I Have Learned to Respect the Power of Love", which was a number-one hit for 2 weeks on Billboard's Top R&B Songs chart.

Jazz musician George Duke produced the tracks "Automatic Passion", "Under Pressure", "Rising Desire" and "Just You". Richard Rudolph husband of late singer Minnie Riperton produced the tracks "Time of Your Life" and "Hold On to Midnight".

Track listing

Personnel 
 Stephanie Mills – lead vocals, backing vocals (1, 3, 5, 7)
 Randy Cantor – keyboards (1)
 Carl Sturken – bass synthesizer (1)
 Jim Salamone – Fairlight programming (1), drum programming (1)
 George Duke – clavinet (2), Rhodes (2), Yamaha DX7 (2, 6), Memorymoog (2, 6), Synclavier II (2, 6, 8), bass synthesizer (2), acoustic piano (6), Prophet-5 (6), Korg DW-6000 (8), Linn 9000 (8)
 Gary Chang – Fairlight CMI (3), programming (3)
 Raymond Jones – Yamaha DX7 (3), Oberheim OB-8 (3), Ensoniq Mirage (3), Fairlight CMI (3), LinnDrum (3)
 Larry Williams – keyboards (4, 5), synthesizers (4, 5), flute solo (5)
 Rod Temperton – synthesizer arrangements (4, 5), string arrangements (4), vocal arrangements (4), rhythm arrangements (5), backing vocals (5)
 Ron Kersey – keyboards (7), Yamaha QX-1 sequencer (7), LinnDrum (7)
 Ron Jennings – guitars  (1)
 Chuck Gentry – guitars (2)
 Paul Jackson Jr. – guitars (2, 8)
 Michael Landau – lead guitar (6),  acoustic guitar (6)
 John McGhee – guitars (7)
 Abraham Laboriel – bass (6)
 Freddie "Ready" Washington – bass (7)
 John Robinson – drums (2)
 Paulinho da Costa – percussion (2)
 Sam Peake – saxophone (1)
 Mark Russo – alto saxophone (2)
 Robert Brookins – backing vocals (2, 6)
 Carl Carwell – backing vocals (2, 6, 8)
 Lynn Davis – backing vocals (2, 6, 7, 8)
 Maxi Anderson – backing vocals (7)
 Alexandra Brown – backing vocals (7)
 Cydney Davis – backing vocals (8)

Production 
 Stephanie Mills – executive producer
 Nick Martinelli – producer (1)
 George Duke – producer (2, 3, 6, 8)
 Richard Rudolph – producer (4, 5)
 Ron Kersey – producer (7)
 Michael Tarisa – recording (1)
 Taavi Mote – remixing (1), mixing (7)
 Louil Silas Jr. – remixing (1)
 Erik Zobler – recording (2, 3, 6, 8)
 Tommy Vicari – mixing (2, 3, 6, 8)
 Paul McKenna – recording (4, 5), mixing (4, 5)
 Hill Swimmer – recording (7)
 Joe Borja – assistant engineer (4, 5)
 Robert de la Garza – assistant engineer (4, 5)
 Clyde Kaplan – assistant engineer (4, 5)
 Magic Moreno – assistant engineer (4, 5)
 Tom Nist – assistant engineer (4, 5)
 Brad Coker – assistant engineer (7)
 Paul Howard – assistant engineer (7)
 Glenn Kurtz – assistant engineer (7)
 Bernie Grundman – mastering at A&M Studios (Hollywood, California)
 Cassandra Mills – project coordinator, album concept 
 Jeff Adamoff – art direction 
 Norm Ung – design 
 DZN – design
 Ron Slenzak – front cover photography
 Dick Zimmerman – back cover photography
 Starlight Music, Inc. – management

Charts

Singles

References

1985 albums
Stephanie Mills albums
MCA Records albums